Al-Jiraf, also transliterated as al-Juraf, is a small village in Ath'thaorah District of Amanat al-Asimah Governorate, Yemen. It is located 5 km north of the old city of Sanaa.

الجراف الخاصة ل محمد شاكر 
According to Hermann von Wissmann, al-Jiraf is named after a tribe mentioned in Himyaritic inscriptions.

History 
The 10th-century author al-Hamdani described al-Jiraf as marking the start of Hashid territory north of Sanaa. Its period of greatest historical importance was during the 1500s, when it served as the capital of al-Mutawakkil Yahya Sharaf ad-Din, who was Imam of Yemen from 1505 to 1558.

References 

Villages in Sanaa Governorate